The Gold Coast Techspace is a Hackerspace and education centre focusing on electronics, computer programming, and 3D printing. It is currently located at the Mudgeeraba Old Post Office, Mudgeeraba, Gold Coast, Queensland, Australia.

Gold Coast Techspace is a central component of the Gold Coast startup ecosystem and has a sister relationship with Xinchejian, a Hackerspace in Shanghai, China.

History 

The space was started by a group of local technologists, Lucas Brandt, Steven Dalton & Nick Byrne in 2011. Shortly after acquiring their first location in Johnston St, Southport, Gold Coast Techspace (GCTS), was incorporated as a Queensland Incorporated Association (Non-profit) and has operated this way since. 

For a while the Gold Coast TechSpace also ran the first coworking space on the Gold Coast – Gold Coast Co-working. As more coworking spaces emerged on the Gold Coast, the GCTS Co-Working space was closed to allow the space to focus on its core activities.

Over the years GCTS has held or participated in a number of collaborative events to encourage development in technology in the local area, these include the Gold Coast Science Fair 2013 and numerous BarCamps; open, participatory meetup.com stylised workshop events designed to provide a representative stage for potential technology ideas, demonstrations &/or start-ups .

Activities 

Gold Coast TechSpace is the instigator of a number of technology related activities on the Gold Coast including:

 The first gateway location for the Gold Coast's public access LPWAN using The Things Network
Barcamp Gold Coast

See also

 Maker culture
 Hackerspace
 Open source hardware
 Robotics
 Internet of Things
 LPWAN

References

External links
 Gold Coast Techspace Website
 Gold Coast Techspace Meetup Group

DIY culture
Hackerspaces
Computer clubs
Hacker culture
Organisations based in Queensland
Education on the Gold Coast, Queensland